The World Youth Student and Educational Travel Confederation was formed in 2006.  It has a network of 5000 locations in 118 countries.
 
The International Student Travel Confederation was a non-profit organisation founded in 1949 with a goal to secure and inform students of cheaper and or tax free travel. Working in more than 100 countries. It merged with the  Federation of Youth Travel Organisation in 2006 to form a new organisation based in Amsterdam.

Local Associations that belong to ISIC (partial list)
Argentina: ASATEJ
Australia: STA Travel
Belarus: Youth Travel Centre
Belgium: Connections
Brazil: STB Student Travel Bureau
Perú: ISIC - INTEJ
Canada: Canadian Federation of Students-Services (CFS-Services)
Denmark: STA Travel Denmark
France: Wasteels Voyages
India: STIC Travels
Israel: Issta
Japan: University Coop. Federation
Lebanon: Campus Travel
Mexico: SETEJ Mexico A.C.
New Zealand: STA Travel
Poland: Almatur
South Africa: STA Travel
United Kingdom: STA Travel

External links
 http://www.istc.org/

References

International non-profit organizations
International student organizations
Non-profit organisations based in the Netherlands
Organisations based in Amsterdam
Travelers organizations